Arthur Coy (17 December 1902 – 15 May 1983) was a South African cricketer. He played in twenty-four first-class matches for Eastern Province from 1934/35 to 1947/48. Coy was also a member of the South African Cricket Association during the D'Oliveira affair.

See also
 List of Eastern Province representative cricketers

References

External links
 

1902 births
1983 deaths
South African cricketers
Eastern Province cricketers
People from Folkestone and Hythe District